Palazzo Jacopo da Brescia was a Renaissance palace in Rome, Italy, which was located in the Borgo rione.

It was built for Jacopo (also known as Giacomo di Bartolomeo) da Brescia, a physician at the service of Pope Leo X, between 1515 and 1519. Its design is commonly attributed to Raphael, and was based to  Bramante's nearby Palazzo Caprini (also demolished). The palace, which had a triangular footprint, stood at the confluence of Borgo Nuovo and Borgo S.Angelo.  On Borgo Nuovo, the house bordered to the east the house of Febo Brigotti, doctor of Pope Paul III, another notable renaissance building. It was demolished to allow the construction of the Via della Conciliazione in 1937, and rebuilt (with a different footprint) along Via Rusticucci and Via dei Corridori, not far from its original location.

References

Houses completed in 1519
Jacopo Da Brescia
Renaissance architecture in Rome
Buildings and structures demolished in 1937
Raphael buildings
Jacopo